The Polish census of 1921 or First General Census in Poland was the first census in the Second Polish Republic, performed on September 30, 1921 by the Main Bureau of Statistics (Główny Urząd Statystyczny). It was followed by the Polish census of 1931.

Content
Due to war, not all of interwar Poland was enumerated. Upper Silesia was formally assigned to Poland by the League of Nations after the census was conducted elsewhere. Meanwhile, the conditions in eastern Galicia were still unstable and chaotic, and the census data had to be adjusted after the fact, wrote Joseph Marcus, thus leading to more questions than answers. The army and personnel under military jurisdiction were not included in the results. Also, specific areas of considerable size lacked complete returns due to absence of war refugees.

Entire categories considered essential today were absent from the questionnaires, subject to historic interpretation at any given time. For example, the Ukrainians were lumped with the Rusyns (as Ruthenes) with the only distinguishing factor possible being religion. Within a single total number of Ruthenes (narodowość rusińska), separate categories existed only for Greek Catholics (68.4 percent or 2,667,840 of them) and Orthodox Christians (31 percent or 1,207,739 of the total),[page 80]  but did not address language in the same way as the next Polish census of 1931. Neither the Ukrainians, Carpatho-Rusyns (or Rusnaks), nor Polesians were defined by their name. The categories listed in the census included verbatim: Narodowość: polska (polonais), rusińska (ruthènes), żydowska (juifs), białoruska (biėlorusses), niemiecka (allemands), litewska (lithuaniens), rosyjska (russes), tutejsza (indigène), czeska (tchèques), inna (autre), niewiadoma (inconnue).

Results

Nationality

Religion

References

External links

Partial results
Partial results when searching for the following keyword: Spis powszechny - Polska 1921 r
Nationalities (page 56, polish-french version) at Stat.gov.pl.

1921
1921 in Poland
Poland